Phassus championi is a moth of the family Hepialidae first described by Herbert Druce in 1887. It is known from Guatemala.

References

Moths described in 1887
Hepialidae